The men's madison event at the 2020 Summer Olympics took place on 7 August 2021 at the Izu Velodrome. 32 cyclists (16 teams of 2) from 16 nations competed.

Background
This will be the 4th appearance of the event. It was held from 2000 to 2008, then dropped for 2012 and 2016 due to there being no women's equivalent. The event is returning in 2020 with a new women's counterpart.

The reigning (2008) Olympic champions are Juan Curuchet and Walter Pérez of Argentina. The reigning (2020) World Champions are Lasse Norman Hansen and Michael Mørkøv of Denmark.

Russia, Germany, China, Great Britain, Australia, and the Netherlands are traditionally strong track cycling nations.

Qualification

A National Olympic Committee (NOC) could enter up to 1 team of 2 cyclists in the madison. Quota places are allocated to the NOC, which selects the cyclists. Qualification is entirely through the 2018–20 UCI nation rankings. The 8 top nations in the team pursuit rankings automatically qualified a team in the Madison. The best 8 NOCs in the madison rankings (not already qualified through the team pursuit) also qualified to enter madison teams. The NOCs qualifying directly in the madison also earned 1 spot in the omnium. Because qualification was complete by the end of the 2020 UCI Track Cycling World Championships on 1 March 2020 (the last event that contributed to the 2018–20 rankings), qualification was unaffected by the COVID-19 pandemic.

Competition format

A madison race is a tag team points race that involves all 16 teams competing at once. One cyclist from each team competes at a time; the two team members can swap at any time by touching (including pushing and handslinging). The distance is 200 laps (50 km). Teams score points in two ways: lapping the field and sprints. A team that gains a lap on the field earns 20 points; one that loses a lap has 20 points deducted. Every 10th lap is a sprint, with the first to finish the lap earning 5 points, second 3 points, third 2 points, and fourth 1 point. The points values are doubled for the final sprint. There is only one round of competition.

Schedule
All times are Japan Standard Time (UTC+9)

Results

Whereas the women's race had been a showcase for one team's complete dominance, the men's race was delicately poised between several teams until the closing laps, with all three medalists separated by only three points, and no team able to take a lap in the entire race. Although they won only 3 of the sprints, Denmark's Lasse Norman Hansen and Michael Mørkøv had, with consistent points finishes, sewn up the gold medal before the final sprint for ten points. This left the final sprint between the British pair of Ethan Hayter and Matthew Walls and the French duo of Benjamin Thomas and Donavan Grondin. The British pair held off all challengers to win silver, claiming the ten points for the final sprint, bringing them level with France on 40 points, but condemning the French to bronze based on finishing position in the final sprint.

References

Men's Madison
Cycling at the Summer Olympics – Men's madison
Men's events at the 2020 Summer Olympics